Abdullah Saleh Al Mulla (died 1955) was Secretary of State in Kuwait under the Emirs Sheikh Ahmad Al-Jaber Al-Sabah and Sheikh Abdullah III Al-Salim Al-Sabah. He was one of the first Kuwaitis to be educated in Britain during the early 1900s, and the country's first Secretary of State that was able to directly deal with the Western world during a pivotal period of Kuwait's history, the discovery of oil. During his tenure as Secretary of State, and given his fluency in the English language, he acted on behalf of the Emir in discussions with major international oil companies to start exploration and drilling for oil in Kuwait. He was instrumental in negotiating terms between the Kuwaiti government and the companies, which eventually led to the first oil wells in Kuwait. He was also the first to recommend and negotiate on behalf of the Kuwaiti government for the installation and commissioning of Kuwait's first desalination plant located in Shuwaikh, as well as the first to coordinate the commissioning of Kuwait's first major power station.

In recognition of his efforts in strengthening bilateral relations between Kuwait and the United Kingdom, he was recognized as a recipient of the Most Excellent Order of the British Empire (MBE) by Queen Elizabeth II in 1953.

In 1938, Abdullah Saleh Al Mulla, then-Secretary of State of Kuwait, opened a store for electrical appliances in downtown Kuwait City.

Sources
Al Mulla Group history

1955 deaths
Kuwaiti businesspeople
Kuwaiti diplomats
Year of birth missing
Date of death missing
20th-century Kuwaiti businesspeople